Barbara Maria O'Toole (born 24 February 1960), known as Mo O'Toole, is a former politician in the United Kingdom.

O'Toole attended Sacred Heart Convent School in Fenham, Newcastle upon Tyne, then studied at Northumbria University.  Soon afterwards, she married future Labour Party MP Alan Milburn, although the couple split in the late 1980s.  During this period, O'Toole also served as a Labour Party councillor in Newcastle-upon-Tyne.

O'Toole then completed a PhD at the University of Newcastle upon Tyne, then became a lecturer in Government and Public Policy, first at the University of Bristol, then at Newcastle.  At the European Parliament election, 1999, she was elected for the Labour Party in North East England from third on the party list.  She lost her seat in 2004, despite being moved up to second on the party list. O'Toole was on an all-woman shortlist to be the Labour candidate in the safe seat of Bishop Auckland at the 2005 general election, but was not selected.

Since 2008 she has been a visiting Professor for Culture, Creativity and Innovation at Newcastle University and, from 2010, partner in the Independent Wine Store Carruthers and Kent  in Gosforth, Newcastle.

References

 "O’TOOLE, Dr Barbara Maria, (Mo)", Who's Who 2010, A & C Black, 2010; online edn., Oxford University Press, Dec 2009; online edn, Nov 2009, accessed 21 Dec 2009.

1960 births
Living people
Academics of the University of Bristol
Academics of Newcastle University
Alumni of Northumbria University
Alumni of Newcastle University
Councillors in Tyne and Wear
Labour Party (UK) councillors
Labour Party (UK) MEPs
English people of Irish descent
Politicians from Newcastle upon Tyne
MEPs for England 1999–2004
Women councillors in England